A mongrel is a dog that does not belong to one officially recognized breed and is not the result of intentional breeding.

Mongrel may also refer to:

Music
 Mongrel (band), a British-Irish band formed in 2008
 Mongrel (The Number Twelve Looks Like You album), 2007
 Mongrel (The Bob Seger System album), 1970

Stage and screen
 Mongrel (film), a 1982 American film
 The Mongrel, a 2012 Italian film
 Mongrels (TV series), a British puppet-based situation comedy series

Other uses
 Mongrel (magazine), an Irish magazine 2003–2008
 Mongrel (web server), an open-source software library
 Mongrel Media, a Canadian film distributor
 Mongrel Mob, a New Zealand gang
 Mongrel complex, a national inferiority complex in Brazil
 Mongrel, a 2016 novel by Stephen Graham Jones
 Mongrel, a derogatory term for mixed-race people

See also

 
 Hybrid (biology)
 Mixed breed
 Variety (botany)